Sparganium emersum is a species of flowering plant in the cat-tail family known by the common names European bur-reed and unbranched bur-reed. It has a circumboreal distribution, occurring throughout the northern latitudes of Eurasia and North America. It is an aquatic plant, growing in shallow water bodies such as ponds and streams. It can become abundant at times. It is a perennial herb producing a floating stem up to 2 meters long. The leaves may be limp and floating or stiff and erect, emerging above the water surface. The leaves are flat and straplike, sometimes with a triangular, keeled base that can help distinguish it from the similar Sparganium angustifolium. It is monoecious, individual plants bearing both male and female inflorescences. These are spherical, the male inflorescence a ball of stamens and the female inflorescence a ball of developing fruits growing beneath the male spheres.

References

External links

Jepson Manual Treatment: ssp. emersum
Washington Burke Museum
UBC Botany Photo of the Day
Photo gallery

emersum